WonderMedia was a fabless SoC company headquartered in Taipei, Taiwan. It is a subsidiary of VIA Technologies. It is notable for creating the low cost processors used in many Chinese Android and Windows CE-based devices. The SoC designs are collectively called the WonderMedia PRIZM platform and are based on the reference implementations provided by ARM Holdings.

In 2016, WonderMedia was merged to VIA Technologies.

Products

References

External links
 

Fabless semiconductor companies
VIA Technologies
ARM architecture
Semiconductor companies of Taiwan
Defunct manufacturing companies of Taiwan